Raimundo Wágner Rodrigues e Silva (born 25 July 1971), sometimes known as Raimundinho, is a Brazilian professional football coach and former player who played as a midfielder. He is the current head coach of Floresta.

Career
Born in Juazeiro do Norte, Ceará, Raimundinho played as a midfielder for local teams in his native state. After retiring, he worked as a manager mainly in his native state, being notably in charge of Icasa in 2011 in the Série B. He was also a youth coordinator at Guarani de Juazeiro in 2013 and Floresta in 2018.

On 23 July 2019, Raimundinho was named manager of Atlético Cearense. He led the side to a first-ever promotion in the Série D in 2021, but resigned on 11 January 2022 after alleging personal reasons, and was appointed in charge of Pacajus late in the month.

Raimundinho returned to Floresta on 22 March 2022, being named manager of the team for the year's Campeonato Cearense Segunda Divisão, while Ricardo Drubscky was in charge of the side during the 2022 Série C. On 30 November, he was named the sole head coach of the club for the 2023 season.

Honours

Manager
Barbalha
Campeonato Cearense Terceira Divisão: 2007

Alto Santo
Campeonato Cearense Terceira Divisão: 2015

Floresta
Copa Fares Lopes: 2017

References

External links

1971 births
Living people
People from Juazeiro do Norte
Brazilian footballers
Association football midfielders
Brazilian football managers
Campeonato Brasileiro Série B managers
Campeonato Brasileiro Série D managers
Associação Desportiva Recreativa e Cultural Icasa managers
Ferroviário Atlético Clube (CE) managers
Guarani Esporte Clube (CE) managers
Floresta Esporte Clube managers
Campinense Clube managers
Sportspeople from Ceará